List of writers, producers and directors who have worked on the American soap opera Passions.

B
Ethel Brez
Associate head writer (1999-2002)

Mel Brez
Associate head writer (1999-2002)

Peter Brinckerhoff
Director (entire run)

C
Lisa de Cazotte
Executive producer (entire run)

E
Clem Egan
Script writer (2004-2008, 2008)

J
Grant A. Johnson
Director (2000-2003)

G
N. Gail Lawrence
Associate head writer (2001-2007)

M
Shawn Morrison
Associate head writer (1999-2003, 2007-2008)
Script writer (2007)

N
Roger Newman
Script writer (1999-2004)

P
Cynthia J. Popp
Director (1999)

Marlene Clark Poulter
Associate head writer (entire run)

R
James E. Reilly
Head writer (entire run)
Consulting producer (entire run)

Pete T. Rich
Script writer (entire run)

Kathleen Robinson

S
Jim Sayegh
Director (entire run)

Peggy Schibi
Script writer (1999-2007)

Richard R. Schilling III
Producer (entire run)

Michael Slade
Script writer (2004-2005)

T
Maralyn Thoma
Script writer (1999-2007)

Darrell Ray Thomas Jr.
Associate head writer (entire run)

Gary Tomlin
Director (2000-2001, 2003-2008)

W
Nancy Williams Watt
Script writer (1999-2007)

Mary-Kelly Weir
Producer (2000-2008)

Karen Wilkens
Director (entire run)

X
Phideaux Xavier
Director (1999, 2001-2008)

Passions